Goorganga Plains is a coastal locality in the Whitsunday Region, Queensland, Australia.

Geography
The Proserpine River forms most of the northern boundary, while the Coral Sea forms the eastern. Thompson Creek forms the southern boundary.

Road infrastructure
The Bruce Highway follows the south-western boundary before passing through the north-west corner.

References 

Whitsunday Region
Coastline of Queensland
Localities in Queensland